ITHF table hockey is a sport played on table hockey games. International Table Hockey Federation (ITHF) is an organization that oversees these competitions. The origin of the sport was the Swedish Championship 1982 in Upplands Väsby. Organized table hockey is played in northern, central and eastern Europe, in North America, but table hockey is also played in South America, Africa, Australia, and Asia.

The World Championship is organized by the ITHF every two years. The models, produced by Stiga, are the official game for competitions.

Sweden has dominated the table hockey scene from the beginning and a couple of years into the new millennium. Until the Finnish gold in Riga 2005, Sweden had won all Team World Championships, until 2006 only Swedes had won the Open Swedish Masters, and until 2007 all individual world champions were Swedes. But the new generation of players comes from Finland, Russia, Ukraine, Czech Republic, Latvia, Canada, Denmark, the United States, Estonia, Kazakhstan, Switzerland, Norway, Slovenia, Hungary, Slovakia and Lithuania, and its current world champion is Yanis Galuzo from Russia. However, from December 2013 until 2021 Maxim Borisov from Russia had been ranked #1 in the world. In 2021 national team competition Latvia was the winner.

Since the sport expands quickly in many countries, the table hockey map may have to be redrawn within a couple of years when nations other than the big eight (Sweden, Finland, Russia, Czech Republic, Norway, Estonia, Latvia and Ukraine) produce new talents.

History

First table hockey games were made during the 1930s in Sweden and Canada. Naturally there was no plastic, so they were made from sheet metal.

The use of plastic brought an expansion of table hockey. The Swedish company Stiga started to make hockey tables in the late 1950s. Thanks to the enthusiasm of Swedish players, table hockey expanded to the rest of the world.

Big worldwide development arrived in the late 1990s. That led to an idea founding an international federation. ITHF was established during the World Championship 2005 in Riga, Latvia. Now it associates 21 national federation.

Especially in Sweden, Finland, Russia, Czech Republic, Ukraine and Latvia, table hockey is quite popular. But it is growing in lots of countries and there are many tournaments played every week.

Game rules

These are the most important rules. Whole rules.

Game model and preparation

Stiga games must be used.
Goal cups must be removed.
Games must be fastened to the table.
The speed of the game's surface must be kept the same as the usual factory surface speed.

Playing figures

Figures from the Stiga Play-off versions (all figures have the stick on the same side) of Stiga table hockey games must be used.

Matches

Matches last five minutes.
Time runs even if the puck is out of play.
An audio timer should be used for all matches.
If any player retires during a match when the opponent insists on continuing, he/she automatically loses all his/her goals scored during the game, while the opponent may add an extra five goals to his/her score.
During the play-off matches, in the event of a draw at the end of the five minutes, there is an overtime. The overtime starts with a new face-off. The winner is the one who scores the first goal (sudden death).

Face-offs

All matches begin with the puck placed at centre spot. Game starts with the opening signal. If any player plays the puck before the signal, face-off is made.
Face-offs are made by dropping the puck on the centre spot.

Centre forwards and left defenders must stay on their own side of the centre red line during a face-off.

Players must be sure that their opponent is ready before releasing the puck. If the face-off is made wrong the opponent is allowed to ask for a new one or he/she may make a new face-off by himself/herself. If a player makes a lot of bad drops in a play-off match, the opponent can ask for a neutral dropper.
Three seconds must elapse after each face-off before a valid goal can be scored. This rule is in effect even if a neutral person is making the face-off.
The puck must hit the sideboards, or a playing figure other than the center must gain control of the puck before a goal can be counted.

Scoring

The puck must stay in the goal cage for the goal to count. In and outs do not count. If the puck goes out from the goal cage, the match continues without interruption
If any player wants to interrupt the game in order to avoid the goal heading into his cage, he must clearly say a short phrase. The game is interrupted and puck placed in the middle of the board for the next face off. The phrase could only be said if the player keeps the puck long enough to enable his opponent to say it.
The puck must be removed from the puck catcher (if there is any) before the next face off.
A goal scored directly by pressing a motionless puck against the goal cage or against the goalie does not count. A goal scored in this way indirectly (off the bank or off another figure) counts.
If a goal is scored when the final buzzer is sounding, the goal is not valid.
If any figure or goalie breaks when a goal is scored, the goal is valid.
A goal scored by moving the whole game is not valid.

Goal crease rule

If the puck is in full rest in goal crease and is touching the goal line the defending player may call "block" and a new face-off is made.
If the puck is in full rest in goal crease and is not touching the goal line the defending player must play the puck.

Possession rule

It is not permitted to retain possession of the puck without making any recognizable attempt to score a goal. This is regarded as passive play.
If the puck is kept in possession by one figure without passing or shooting, a warning can be given by the opponent after five (5) seconds has elapsed since the figure gained puck control.

Interference

A player can tap down his/her figures only when he/she has complete possession of the puck.
If a player scores a goal while the opponent is tapping his/her figures, the goal counts.
Rough playing that results in shaking of the game and causing the puck to move is forbidden.
If any figure loses possession of the puck due to shaking of the game, then the puck must be returned to this figure.

Interruption

If any unusual situation happens (e.g. broken gear, rod or game, displaced goal cage, lights go out, several pucks appear on the game or somebody/something interrupts any of the opponents), the match must be immediately suspended. A player can interrupt the game by saying "stop" if the opponent is not aware of such situation. The match resumes when both players are ready again.
If a match is interrupted and significant time is lost then the lost time must be added to remaining time and the match continues.
If a player had indisputable control of the puck before the interruption, the match continues with the puck in the place where it was, otherwise a new face-off is made.

World Table Hockey Tour
In 2003/04, the first worldwide league, EuroLeague (EL), was created. 6 tournaments formed the league, The tournaments were Helsinki Open, Oslo Open, Riga Cup, Swedish Masters, Moscow Open and Czech Open.

The league has changed name to World Table Hockey Tour (WT), and consists every year of around 15 tournaments. The original 6 tournaments (B6) were still regarded as the most important tournaments, and were called the Big Six tournaments. After the main tournaments were called SuperSeries, and at season (2021/2022) there are planned 6 SuperSeries tournaments (in Slovenia, Latvia, Sweden, Estonia, Czech Republic and Russia).

ITHF World ranking

The World ranking table sorts players by their actual rank points. The ranking is sum of player's best results in last two years. Points, which player gets for 	
participating in any reported tournament are counted on the basis of: level of the tournament, number of players beaten and world ranking of players beaten. A winner of the World Championship gets always 1010 points and a winner of Europe Championship and North America Championship gets at least 610 points.
World ranking with a reduced coefficient calculated points to six years. In the world ranking is more than 10 000 players from more than 50 countries and six continents, organized through about 520 clubs.

ITHF ranking - nations
Rank points of a country is sum of its five best players. The table below shows top ten nations as of September 28, 2021. Complete table

ITHF ranking - open

ITHF ranking - ladies

See also
Table hockey games
Air hockey
Stiga
An equivalent for soccer football is Table football (or "foosball").

Notes

External links
International Table Hockey Federation

Table hockey